Lake Transit is a bus agency providing fixed-route, flex-stop and curbside "Dial-a-Ride" bus service in Lake County, California. The agency also provides service to Ukiah in Mendocino County and St. Helena in northern Napa County.

The Lake Transit Authority, which governs the Lake Transit system, is composed of two members apiece from Clearlake and Lakeport city councils, the Lake County Board of Supervisors and two members at-large.

The system is funded by a combination of passenger fares, local transportation funds, state transit assistance funds, Federal Transit Act rural and inter-city grant funds, and service agreements with medical and community-based organizations.

Senate Bill 787 provided $1.5 million to construct a $2.1 million operations and maintenance facility that opened in 2004.

Routes
Some routes operate on weekdays only: no service is provided on Sundays and observed public holidays.

Clearlake is the central area of Clearlake, bounded by Lakeshore Drive, Olympic Drive and Old Highway 53.
Kit's Corner is at the junction of Route 29 and the south end of Soda Bay Road.
The Avenues are in Clearlake east of Highway 53.
Clearlake Park is north of Clearlake, near Borax Lake.
South Clearlake or Ray's Food Place which is a grocery store at the intersection  of Route 53 and Dam Road.
Kmart is in South Lakeport, at the northern end of Soda Bay Road, near the intersection of routes 29 and 175
Sutter Hospital is in North Lakeport.

Previous Routes

References

External links
Lake Transit official website
List of Lake Transit routes and descriptions
Lake Transit Dial-a-Ride and Flex-Stop policies

Bus transportation in California
Public transportation in the San Francisco Bay Area
Public transportation in Lake County, California
Lower Lake, California